This is a list of defunct airlines of Greece.

See also

 List of airlines of Greece
 List of airports in Greece

References

Greece
Airlines
Airlines, defunct